Inamdar may refer to:

 Inamdar (feudal title)
 Inamdar (surname)